Adam Bernstein (born May 7, 1960) is an American film director, music video director and television director. For his work on the television show Fargo in 2014, he received a nomination for the Primetime Emmy Award for Outstanding Directing for a Miniseries, Movie or a Dramatic Special.  In 2007, he won a Primetime Emmy Award for Outstanding Comedy Series for his work on 30 Rock.

Biography
Bernstein was born in Princeton, New Jersey, and is of half Jewish and half Italian ancestry. In 1973, he was the recipient of the Good Citizenship Medal from the Daughters of the American Revolution. A member of the Princeton University Class of 1982, Bernstein began his career as an animator. He later went on to direct Nickelodeon’s first original live-action, scripted comedy, The Adventures of Pete & Pete, in 1986. His work as a director includes over seventy music videos, amongst which are  "Love Shack" for the B-52's, "Hey Ladies" for the Beastie Boys and "Baby Got Back" for Sir Mix-a-Lot. Additionally, he has helmed  the pilots for Fargo, 30 Rock, Scrubs, Alpha House and Strangers with Candy, and multiple episodes of Oz and Breaking Bad.

Bernstein has been married to actress Jessica Hecht since 1995 (they both worked on Breaking Bad, in which she starred as Gretchen, with Bernstein directing the seasons 1-5 episodes, on five seasons on the show).

He was an adjunct faculty member at Williams College teaching theatre and filmmaking along with his wife.

Television credits 
 The Sinner (2020)
 City on a Hill (2019)
 Weird City (2019)
 Fosse/Verdon (2019)
 Sneaky Pete (2018)
 Sweetbitter (2018)
 The Mist (2017)
 Doubt (2017)
 Orange Is the New Black (2016)
 Outsiders (2016)
 The Brink (2015)
 Nurse Jackie (2015)
 Bloodline (2015)
 Better Call Saul (2015–2018)
 Fargo (2014)
 Masters of Sex (2014)
 Next Caller (2013)
 Alpha House (2013)
 House of Lies (2012-2013)
 The Big C (2012)
 Smash (2012)
 A Gifted Man (2012)
 Shameless (2011)
 Bored to Death (2011)
 Parenthood (2010)
 Californication (2008–2014)
 Breaking Bad (2008–2012)
 30 Rock (2006): Won Primetime Emmy Award for Outstanding Comedy Series 
 The Bedford Diaries (2006) directed pilot episode
 Scrubs (2001–2007)
 Ed (2001–2003)
 Entourage (2004)
 The Job (2002)
 Oz (1999–2003)
 Action (1999–2000)
 Homicide: Life on the Street (1999)
 Strangers with Candy (1999)
 The Adventures of Pete & Pete (1993)

Selected music video credits 
 "Alternative Girlfriend" by Barenaked Ladies (1995)
 "Headache" by Frank Black (1994)
 "Push th' Little Daisies" by Ween (1993)
 "Baby Got Back" by Sir Mix-a-Lot (1992)
 "American Music" by Violent Femmes (1991)
 "Rockaway" by Ric Ocasek (1990)
 "Hey Ladies" by the Beastie Boys (1989)
 "Love Shack" by The B-52's (1989)
 "Hawaiian Sophie" by Jaz (1989)
 "So Wat Cha Sayin'" by EPMD (1989)
 "Black Steel in the Hour of Chaos" by Public Enemy (1988)
 "You Gots to Chill" by EPMD (1988)
 "I Don't Care" by Audio Two (1988)
 7 music videos by They Might Be Giants (1986–1992)

Film directing credits 
 Bad Apple (2004)
 Six Ways to Sunday (1997) (also writer)
 It's Pat (1994)

References

External links 

1960 births
Living people
American music video directors
American people of Italian descent
American people of Jewish descent
American television directors
People from Princeton, New Jersey
Princeton University alumni
Williams College faculty
Nickelodeon people
Film directors from New Jersey
People from New York City
Fellows of the American Physical Society